Burridge Fort is an Iron Age Hill fort situated to the North East of Barnstaple in Devon, England. The fort occupies a hill top approx 150 Metres above Sea Level overlooking the Yeo and Bradiford rivers.

References

Hill forts in Devon